Baagh e Naazir ("Garden of Nazir") was built by the Mughal emperor Muhammad Shah Rangila's Khwaja Sara (chief eunuch) Nazir in 1748 (1161 A.H.). It is located in Mehrauli, near Jamali Kamali and Mehrauli Archaeological Park.

This garden contained a number of pavilions, the most notable among which was made of red sandstone. Others were made of stone and plaster. The garden was surrounded by a stone wall, large sections of which still exist.

Sir Syed Ahmad Khan's seminal work on the monuments of Delhi, Aasar us Sanadeed, contains a description and a sketch of the monument as it appeared in 1854.

The area has now been taken over by Ashoka Mission, a Buddhist organization.

Gallery

References

Further reading 
Aasar Us Sanaadeed, 2nd edition. By Sir Syed Ahmad Khan, published by Delhi Urdu Academy, Delhi.

Mughal architecture
Mughal gardens
1748 establishments in the Mughal Empire